The Boys' Singles tournament of the 2013 Asian Junior Badminton Championships was held from July 10–14 in Kota Kinabalu, Malaysia. The defending champion of the last edition was Kento Momota from Japan. Thammasin Sitthikom of Thailand who standing in the top seeds was defeated by the No.5 seeded Soo Teck Zhi of Malaysia in the semifinals, while the second seeded Soong Joo Ven of Malaysia fell in the quarterfinals to Jeon Hyuk-jin of South Korea. Soo Teck Zhi emerged as the champion after beat Jeon Hyuk-jin in the finals with the score 21–17, 13–21, 21–15.

Seeded

  Thammasin Sitthikom (semi-final)
  Soong Joo Ven (quarter-final)
  Pannawit Thongnuam (fourth round)
  Heo Kwang-hee (fourth round)
  Soo Teck Zhi (champion)
  Harsheel Dani (fourth round)
  Wang Tzu-wei (semi-final)
  Fikri Ihsandi Hadmadi (fourth round)
  Jeon Hyuk-jin (final)
  Chang Tak Ching (second round)
  Kittiphon Chairojkanjana (fourth round)
  Cheam June Wei (fourth round)
  Lee Cheuk Yiu (second round)
  Ihsan Maulana Mustofa (quarter-final)
  Aditya Joshi (fourth round)
  Yugo Kobayashi (fourth round)

Draw

Finals

Top half

Section 1

Section 2

Section 3

Section 4

Bottom half

Section 5

Section 6

Section 7

Section 8

References

External links 
Main Draw (Archived 2013-07-13)

2013 Asian Junior Badminton Championships